David Jennings (1835–1906) was a member of the Wisconsin State Assembly during the 1891 and 1893 sessions. Other positions he held include Chairman (similar to Mayor) of Mukwa, Wisconsin. He was a Democrat. Jennings was born on November 15, 1835 in Syracuse, New York. He died on December 3, 1906, in New London, Wisconsin.

References

1835 births
1906 deaths
Politicians from Syracuse, New York
People from Waupaca County, Wisconsin
Mayors of places in Wisconsin
19th-century American politicians
Democratic Party members of the Wisconsin State Assembly